Storytelling is the art of portraying real or fictitious events in words, images, and sounds.

Storytelling may also refer to:

Storytelling (film), a 2001 film directed by Todd Solondz
Storytelling (Belle & Sebastian album), a 2002 album by Belle & Sebastian, soundtrack to the film
Storytelling (Jean-Luc Ponty album), a 1989 album by  Jean-Luc Ponty
Storytelling (Fred Frith album), a 2017 album by Fred Frith
"Storytelling", a 2003 song by Funeral for a Friend from Casually Dressed & Deep in Conversation
Storytelling System, a role-playing game system

See also
 Storyteller (disambiguation)
 Stori Telling, a non-fiction book by Tori Spelling
 Telling Stories (disambiguation)